Routh may refer to:

Places 
 Routh, East Riding of Yorkshire, a village in England

People 
 Brandon Routh (born 1979), American actor
 Camilla Belle Routh (born 1986), American actress
 Edward Routh (1831–1907), British mathematician
 Francis John Routh (1927–2021), English composer and author
 Jonathan Routh (1927–2008), British humourist
 Josh Routh (born 1978), contemporary American circus artist
 Martin Joseph Routh, or Martin Routh (1755-1854), British classical scholar
 C.R.N. Routh, wrote Who's Who in Tudor England 1485-1603